R. Olympic Charleroi Châtelet Farcienness, is a Belgian association football club from the city of Charleroi, Hainaut. As of 2019, they play in the Belgian First Amateur Division.

History
It was founded in 1912 as Olympic Club de Charleroi.  The next year the club registered to the Belgian Football Association to become the matricule n°246. Between 1972 and 1982 the club was named R.O.C. de Montignies-sur-Sambre before reverting to its prior name.  In 2000 the club merged with R.A. Marchienne and changed its name from Royal Olympic Club de Charleroi to Royal Olympic Club de Charleroi-Marchienne. Finally in 2019, the club merged with Royal Châtelet S.C. to become R. Olympic Charleroi Châtelet Farciennes.

O.C. de Charleroi first appeared in the second division in 1936 and it won its league eight points ahead of U.S. du Centre, a rival club located nearby Charleroi.  It then played in the first division until 1963 (except for the 1955–56 season), joined at that level by the rival Charleroi S.C. in 1947.  Olympic finished 3rd in 1939 and then second in 1947.  The club had a short come back in the first division in 1967–68 and in 1974–75 but dropped back to the lower leagues, playing mostly at the third or fourth level.

Current squad

References

 Belgian football clubs history
 RSSSF Archive – 1st and 2nd division final tables

External links
Official site

 
Association football clubs established in 1912
Football clubs in Belgium
R.O.C. de Charleroi-Marchienne
1912 establishments in Belgium
Organisations based in Belgium with royal patronage
Belgian Pro League clubs